Zoé Karelli was the pen-name used by Chryssoulas Argyriadou (1901-1998), a Greek poet, playwright and essayist.

Life
Chrysoulas Pentziki was born in Thessaloniki. Her younger brother was the writer Nikos Gavril Pentzikis. She married at the age of 17, acquiring the married name Argyriadou. He first poems were published in the journal The Third Eye, and collected in her debut volume, The March. (1940).

Works

Poetry
 The March, 1940
 Seasons of Death, 1948
 Fantasy of Time, 1949
 Of Solitude and Arrogance, 1951
 Copper Engravings and Sacred Icons, 1952
 The Ship, 1955
 Kassandra and Other Poems, 1955
 Tales from the Garden, 1955
 Contrasts, 1957
 The Mirror of Midnight, 1958

Plays
 Suppliants, 1962
 Simonis, Byzantine Prince, 1965
 Orestes, 1971

References

1901 births
1998 deaths
Greek poets
Greek dramatists and playwrights
Greek essayists